Kozlovskaya is a rural locality (a village) in Rakulo-Kokshengskoye Rural Settlement of Velsky District, Arkhangelsk Oblast, Russia. The population was 263 as of 2014. There are 8 streets.

Geography 
Kozlovskaya is located 50 km east of Velsk (the district's administrative centre) by road. Turovskaya is the nearest rural locality.

References 

Rural localities in Velsky District